Francis David Morley (born 1966) is a United States Navy vice admiral who serves as the Principal Military Deputy to the Assistant Secretary of the Navy (Research, Development and Acquisition) since August 4, 2021. He most recently served as the Deputy Assistant Secretary of the United States Navy for International Programs from September 26, 2016 to August 2021. Previously, he was the Vice Commander of the Naval Air Systems Command from August 2015 to August 2016.

Raised in Phoenix, Arizona, Morley earned a B.S. degree in physics from San Diego State University. Designated a naval aviator, he also graduated from the United States Naval Test Pilot School. Morley later received an M.S. degree in aviation systems from the University of Tennessee as well as National Security Studies and International Security from George Washington University and Harvard Kennedy School of Government respectively.

In June 2021, he was nominated for promotion to vice admiral.

References

External links

1966 births
Living people
Place of birth missing (living people)
People from Phoenix, Arizona
San Diego State University alumni
United States Naval Aviators
United States Naval Test Pilot School alumni
University of Tennessee alumni
United States Navy admirals